Entführung aus der Lindenstraße (meaning 'Kidnap from Linden Street') is a German television film directed by George Moorse.  It was produced in 1995 to celebrate the tenth anniversary of the German television series Lindenstraße, and stars many cast members of that show.

Plot
The ARD television series Lindenstraße is about to be cancelled after its ten-year run.

Obsessive Lindenstraße fan and head computer programmer of the  GEZ, Detlef Hase (portrayed by Herbert Feuerstein) is distraught. He enters the production studio of the show posing as a tourist, sneaks backstage, and kidnaps the actress Marie-Luise Marjan (playing herself) at gunpoint. He calls her 'Helga' or 'Frau Beimer', her Lindenstraße stage-name, and is infatuated with her.  He takes her to an unoccupied castle which belongs to a distant relative of his, and forces her to record a video stating that unless the show Lindenstraße is renewed, the record of all GEZ TV-licenses will be deleted.  To prove his ability to carry out his threat, he deletes all data pertaining to the town Bad Schwartau.  This however alerts the police to his identity, and after searching his apartment they find a map on which the location of the castle is marked.
  
Meanwhile, Marie-Luise begins to admire Hase, and is persuaded to support his attempt to save Lindenstraße. They manage to evade capture by the police and drive to the GEZ headquarters, where they lock themselves in the computer room. As the police break in and arrest him, Hase activates a computer virus that will automatically delete the GEZ data, and that can only be deactivated by him.  As the virus continues to delete data, WDR director Fritz Pleitgen announces publicly that Lindenstraße will be re-commissioned, citing the public outcry over the proposed cancellation as the reason.

In the final scene, set several weeks later, Marie-Luise visits Hase in prison, and offers him an acting role on the show Lindenstraße after the completion of his custodial sentence.

Cast
The protagonist Detlef Hase is portrayed by Herbert Feuerstein. Lindenstraße actress Marie-Luise Marjan and the then-director of WDR, Fritz Pleitgen, play themselves. Other fictional roles in Entführung aus der Lindenstraße are portrayed by cast members of Lindenstraße.

References in the TV Show
Herbert Feuerstein appears in Episode 528 of Lindenstraße as a chimney sweep, and upon seeing Helga, addresses her by name and appears to hold her in veneration.  This can be interpreted as the fulfilment of the conversation between Marie-Luise Marjan and Detlef Hase in the final scene of Entführung aus der Lindenstraße.

In episode 576 a clip from Entführung aus der Lindenstraße appears on television. Erich remarks to Helga: "Actually we could have saved ourselves the cable-TV fees – twenty-seven channels and there’s nothing on!"

Certification
Entführung aus der Lindenstraße is rated FSK 6 - suitable for viewers of age 6 and above.

References

External links
 Entführung aus der Lindenstraße on the Internet Movie Database

1995 films
German television films
German television specials
1990s German-language films
German-language television shows
Das Erste original programming